André Marius Robin (10 October 1922 – 4 June 2007) was a French bobsledder who competed in the 1950s. Competing in two Winter Olympics, he earned his best finish of fifth in the two-man event at Oslo in 1952 Winter Olympics. In the four-man event he finished eleventh.

Four years later he finished 18th in the four-man event at the 1956 Winter Olympics.

References

1952 bobsleigh two-man results
1952 bobsleigh four-man results
1956 bobsleigh four-man results
Bobsleigh four-man results: 1948-64.
André Robin's profile at Sports Reference.com

1922 births
2007 deaths
French male bobsledders
Olympic bobsledders of France
Bobsledders at the 1952 Winter Olympics
Bobsledders at the 1956 Winter Olympics